Gelidium amansii, also known as umutgasari, is an economically important species of red algae commonly found and harvested in the shallow coast (3 to 10 m or 10 to 33 ft of depth below the water) of many East Asian countries including North and South Korea, China, Japan, Singapore, and northeast Taiwan. G. amansii is an important food source in East Asian countries and has been shown to have medicinal effects on dieting. Hence, in folklore medicine G. amansii is used to treat constipation. This algae is used to make agar, whose components are the polysaccharide agarose and agaropectin, from the large amount of algin which is located in the algae's cell wall, as well it is sometimes served as part of a salad, puddings, jams, and other culinary dishes in producing regions. Agar is a gelatinous substance that is commercially used both as an ingredient in gelatinous desserts and as an incubation matrix for microbes and other products that require an ecologically friendly gelatinous matrix. G. amansii can be purple, red, to yellowish-red because it contains the class of pigments known as phycobiliprotein. Its branching body is cartilaginous and can grow up to a height of 8 to 30 cm or 3 to 12 in. G. amansii may have four or five opposite, compound-lobed, pinnate leaves on each branch. It is uniaxial with an apical cell and whorled cells coming from the axial towards the exterior of the algae. The pith is compacted with apical cells and the epidermis is formed by rounded whorled cells. G. amansii is being studied as a cheap biofuel.

See also
 Alginic acid
Chondrus crispus
 List of kampo herbs

References

External links
Algaebase Species: Gelidium amansii (2008)

Algae of Korea
Gelidiaceae